Robert John Brennan (born June 7, 1962) is an American prelate of the Roman Catholic Church who has served as bishop of the Diocese of Brooklyn in New York City since 2021. Previously he served as an auxiliary bishop of the Diocese of Rockville Centre in New York from 2012 to 2019, and as bishop of the Diocese of Columbus in Ohio from 2019 to 2021.

Biography

Early life 
Robert J. Brennan was born on  June 7, 1962, in the Bronx, New York. He attended St. John the Baptist High School in West Islip, New York. His maternal grandfather was an immigrant from Ireland. Robert Brennan earned his undergraduate degree in mathematics from St. John's University in Queens. He studied for his Master of Divinity degree at the Seminary of the Immaculate Conception in Huntington, New York.

Priesthood 
Brennan was ordained a priest for the Diocese of Rockville Centre on May 27, 1989, by Bishop John McGann. Brennan's first pastoral assignment was at St. Patrick Parish in Smithtown, New York.

Brennan was appointed bishop's secretary and served in that role under Bishops McGann, James McHugh, and William F. Murphy. Before his consecration as bishop, Brennan was the pastor of St. Mary's Parish in Long Beach, New York.

Auxiliary Bishop of Rockville Centre 

Brennan was appointed titular bishop of Erdonia and auxiliary bishop of the Diocese of Rockville Centre on June 8, 2012, by Pope Benedict XVI. He received his episcopal consecration on July 25, 2012, from Bishop Murphy. He was also made vicar general of the diocese.

Bishop of Columbus 

Pope Francis appointed Brennan as bishop of the Diocese of Columbus on January 31, 2019. He was installed there on March 29, 2019. 

In December 2020, Brennan announced the "Real Presence Real Future" strategic planning initiative, aiming at "increasing the presence of Christ throughout its 23 counties over the next three years and upholding the Faith for future generations." The initiative, which was hailed as a hallmark of Brennan's 2 1/2 years in the diocese is in the process of releasing draft models grouping parishes and resources together due in part to the shortage of Catholic priests, and likely will result in the closures of some parishes.  The initiative was to be continued by Brennan's successor in Columbus, Bishop Earl Fernandes. 

Brennan was praised for his ecumenism with local church leaders, and his condemnation of racism and police violence, especially following the death of Columbus man Casey Goodson in December 2020. 

The elevation of Saint Mary of the Assumption in Lancaster, Ohio, to the rank of a minor basilica was initiated by Brennan in August of 2019.

Bishop of Brooklyn 
On September 29, 2021, Francis accepted the resignation of Bishop Nicholas DiMarzio of Diocese of Brooklyn and named Brennan to succeed him. Brennan was installed by Cardinal Timothy Dolan on November 30, 2021, at the Co-Cathedral of St. Joseph in Brooklyn.   Brennan's motto, "Thy Will Be Done", a passage from the Lord's Prayer, is engraved upon the headstone of his grandfather, and was on a prayer card that he kept until his death. 

In March of 2022, an investigation into whether Brennan had knowledge of Auxiliary Bishop Raymond Chappetto's withholding of a memo concerning possible sexual abuse by a priest of the Diocese began. The Holy See is conducting an inquiry into the allegations under the motu proprio Vos estis lux mundi.

See also

 Catholic Church hierarchy
 Catholic Church in the United States
 Historical list of the Catholic bishops of the United States
 List of Catholic bishops of the United States
 Lists of patriarchs, archbishops, and bishops

References

External links 
 The Roman Catholic Diocese of Brooklyn Official Site  
 The Roman Catholic Diocese of Columbus Official Site 
 The Roman Catholic Diocese of Rockville Centre Official Site
 "Bishop Robert John Brennan". Catholic-Hierarchy. 

 

}
}
}
}

 

American Roman Catholic clergy of Irish descent
1962 births
Living people
People from the Bronx
Catholics from New York (state)
21st-century Roman Catholic bishops in the United States
Roman Catholic bishops of Columbus